Uruguay national under-20 football team represents Uruguay in international football competitions such as FIFA U-20 World Cup and the South American Youth Football Championship.

Results and fixtures

2022

2023

Competitive record

FIFA U-20 World Cup

South American Youth Football Championship

Minor tournaments

FIFA World Cup matches

Players

Current squad
The following 23 players are called up for the 2023 South American U-20 Championship.

Caps and goals as of 12 February 2023, after the match against Brazil.

Recent call-ups
The following players have also been called up to the squad in the past twelve months.

PRE Preliminary squad
INJ Injured

Coaching staff

Honours
 FIFA U-20 World Cup:
 Runners-up (2): 1997, 2013
 Third place (1): 1979

 South American Youth Football Championship:
 Winners (8): 1954, 1958, 1964, 1975, 1977, 1979, 1981, 2017
 Runners-up (7): 1971, 1974, 1983, 1992, 1999, 2011, 2023
 Third place (6): 1991, 2007, 2009, 2013, 2015, 2019

Notes

See also
 Uruguay national football team
 Uruguay national under-23 football team
 Uruguay national under-17 football team
 South American Youth Football Championship

References

Under-20
South American national under-20 association football teams
Youth sport in Uruguay

External links